Edipresse is a company headquartered in Switzerland. Its main activities are magazine publishing, real estate and digital ventures.

History

The company was founded in 1907 by Paul Allenspach, publisher of the newspaper La Feuille d'Avis de Lausanne. In 1937, the Lamunière and Payot families took joint control over the company. In 1982, Marc and Pierre Lamunière acquired majority control of the company, which became Edipresse SA.

In the 1980s, Edipresse's operations – newspaper and magazine publishing, printing – took place only in Switzerland. During the 1990s, the group expanded its activities internationally, mainly in Southern and Eastern Europe. In 2005, Edipresse entered several Asian markets. Edipresse Media Asia publishes Tatler editions in Hong Kong, mainland China, Singapore, Taiwan, Malaysia, Indonesia, Thailand, and the Philippines. In September 2019, Edipresse Media Asia announced that it would be renamed Tatler Asia Group beginning January 2020.

In March 2009, Edipresse announced its Swiss operations would gradually be incorporated to those of the Tamedia Group, of which Edipresse became a shareholder. The merger was finalised in April 2012. Edipresse quit the Swiss stock exchange in 2011, and in 2012 the company activated the procedure of a squeeze-out merger aimed to buy out the remaining minority shareholders. This procedure was closed in October 2013, making Edipresse a pure family office since then, owned by the Lamunière family.

References

External links
 http://www.edipresse.com
 https://www.tatlerasia.com/

1907 establishments in Switzerland
Companies based in Lausanne
Magazine publishing companies
Mass media in Lausanne
Mass media companies of Switzerland
Newspaper companies
Pan-European media companies
Publishing companies established in 1907
Publishing companies of Switzerland
Swiss companies established in 1907